SoltyRei is a Japanese anime television series animated by Gonzo and AIC following the inhabitants of a city where an Aurora prevents aerial travel. The series aired on TV Asahi between October 2005 and March 2006.

On April 2, 2006, Funimation Entertainment confirmed at Anime Expo that it had the rights to distribute SoltyRei.

On January 26, 2009, the series made its North American television debut on the Funimation Channel.

Story

Glossary
 Aurora Shell
 A protective barrier that holds the atmosphere of the planet in place. Any object that comes into contact with it is affected much the same as being struck by lightning. In addition to the Aurora-like waves of color produced at night, it also hinders air travel and EM wave detection. It is revealed near the end of the series that it contains a large number of nanomachines; after the Blast Fall, children that were exposed to the falling nanomachine snow had their DNA altered, including Rose, Accela, Integra, Sylvia, and Celica.

 Blast Fall
 A disaster that occurred approximately 12 years before the series, where an overly large building of old R.U.C. was struck by a massive lightning from the Aurora Shell, causing widespread death and destruction from the falling debris.

 It was later verified that the Blast Fall was caused by a powerful laser, fired from the migration ship's defense system controlled by Eirene; and shot it into the Aurora Shell to prevent Hilga, with Ashley Lynx as its pilot, from taking off. The laser discharge converted itself into a massive, powerful lightning that obliterated the old R.U.C. headquarters just before Hilga could launch. The blast destroyed everything near the location of ground zero.

 Genuine
 A term used to humans that have 100% full-body Resemble in them. Solty is the only example in the show of a Genuine Resemble.

 Hilga 
 A gargantuan vessel built for flight to space. Being designed as a space vessel, it has the ability to hover within the atmosphere and it is equipped with a powerful hyper beam cannon. It was constructed within the old R.U.C. headquarters. Though Hilga is overwhelmingly massive, it is a one-person vessel and Ashley first serves as its pilot. Their original mission was to investigate the sudden communication silence (and to see Illumina again) from the migration ship several years earlier. Before Hilga could launch it was struck by a powerful lightning, heavily damaging it; obliterated the old R.U.C. headquarters (Hilga's launch base); and part of the city that surrounds it. That disaster was later known as the Blast Fall. After that disaster, it was repaired and docked at the center of the new R.U.C. headquarters. Hilga's existence remained hidden in secret for 12 years until it was hijacked by Accela, its second pilot, who used Hilga as a weapon of destruction. It was heavily damaged when Accela forced to shut close Hilga's fully charged hyper beam cannon's opening to prevent its firing. It was repaired again for Solty's use, its third pilot, to stop Eirene and the migration ship from its collision course to a newly terra-formed planet. It successfully took off to outer space but was finally destroyed by Eirene's defense weapons.

 New Rights Child
 A term describing children who were unconditionally granted rights as Registered Citizens after the Blast Fall. In the wake of the catastrophe, a large number of children who could not be identified were sent to city orphanages. In response, the city's political leadership decided to grant a number of these orphans residency in order to give them access to healthcare and other city amenities. The first individual to be identified as a New Rights Child is Rita Revant. After being visited by Roy Revant (who mistakenly believes her to be his daughter), Rita explains that she is able to receive welfare and live in the countryside because of her benefits as a New Rights Child.

 PROCEED
 Name given to young girls genetically altered as a byproduct from the Blast Fall. Each altered female has many physical characteristics enhanced (strength, speed, etc.) and also a different degree of enhancement on human ability to interface with machines. As the alteration caused by the Blast Fall also changed even hair color on some cases, it is the reason why Rose changed from a redhead into a blonde girl.

 The quartet of specialist operatives commanded by Ashley Lynx are all PROCEEDs of high physical capacity. Probably the ability of easy interface with machines is also the reason why they bear the Power Suits we see them using when in a mission. These suits bear a striking resemblance to the Knight Saber's Hardsuits from Bubblegum Crisis, as the concept designer for both series is Kenichi Sonoda. Notice that they are the only ones wearing Power Suits, which leads to think such could be only used by PROCEEDs. These suits allow certain abilities unique to each of the four members. Notably, while Ashley is fighting Integra, he refers to her ability as 'Overclock'. The abilities of the other members of the team may have names too, but these are not mentioned. The four members are all named after models of cars.

 R.U.C. (Reestablishment Universe Committee)
 A general company/government that manages daily activities in the city, much like the Paradigm Group in The Big O. In addition to a private security force, they also have large four-leggeded mechas resembling construction cranes. The R.U.C. was created by the colony supervisor computer Eunomia as a means of regulating the city.

 Registered Citizen/Unregistered Citizen
 A differential classification for residents of the city, established by Eunomia as a means of regulating resource distribution amongst the residents. Registered Citizens are officially sanctioned residents who are able to receive healthcare, schooling, welfare, and other amenities from the government. Unregistered Citizens, on the other hand, cannot receive municipal healthcare or many of the other amenities offered to Registered Citizens. While the Unregistered Citizens are not illegal occupants of the city per se, they are often regarded, both officially and effectively, as the lower caste among the residents of the city. Many Unregistered Citizens occupy the older, unregulated underground city, while most Registered Citizens live in residences built on the surface.

 While the original means of establishing the differentiation between the two groups is undisclosed, the classification system is maintained largely based on familial ties. All biological offspring of Registered Citizens are considered to also be Registered Citizens. In addition, each married pair of Registered Citizens is able to adopt one Unregistered Citizen as a child. As a result, the child becomes reclassified as a Registered Citizen. Celica Yayoi is an example of this.

 Conversely, offspring and wards of Unregistered Citizens will also be classified as Unregistered Citizens. An example of this principle can be found with regard to Vincent Greco's daughter, who was renamed Rita Revant. Greco explains that he cannot tell his daughter that he is her father, because the discovery of his true relationship to her would cause a revocation of her rights as a Registered Citizen as a New Rights Child.

 Resemble
 A broad term for technologically advanced prostheses used to replace human body parts, became more widespread after the Blast Fall due to the sheer number of injuries sustained during the event. Humans who use this technology are known as Resembles. It is later revealed that their Resemble parts are linked to Eunomia, the central computer of R.U.C.

Media

Anime

Madman Entertainment has acquired rights for distribution of Solty Rei in Australia and New Zealand and released it on six DVD volumes between 15 August 2007 and 23 January 2008. A complete collection, including the OVA as episodes 25 and 26, was released on 17 September 2008.

Music
A list of theme songs and insert songs from the anime:

Opening Theme: 
"clover": Episode:01 - 23 and Extra Episode(25 - 26)
Lyrics and composition by: meg rock
Arrangement by: Daisuke Katou
Performed by: meg rock

Ending Theme:
: Episode:01 - 11, 13 - 23 and Extra Episode(25 - 26)
Lyrics and composition by: Masami Okui
Arrangement by: Jun Ichikawa
Performed by: Tomoe Ohmi
"Return to love": Episode:12 and 24 
Lyrics and composition by: Masami Okui
Arrangement by: Jun Ichikawa
Performed by: Tomoe Ohmi

Insert Theme: 
"take you there": Episode:04
Lyrics, composition and arrangement by: R・O・N
Performed by: R・O・N featuring Takuto Maeda from count lost
"promise": Episode:05
Lyrics, composition and arrangement by: R・O・N
Performed by: R・O・N
"Return to love (Jazz version)": Episode:12, 13 and 24
Lyrics by: Masami Okui
English lyrics by: Mika Watanabe
Composition by: Masami Okui
Arrangement by: Toshiyuki Ōmori
Performed by: Geila Zilkha
"(Why I’m right here) with you": Episode:16
Lyrics, composition and arrangement by: R・O・N
Performed by: R・O・N
"Wish For...": Episode:18
Lyrics, composition and arrangement by: R・O・N
 Performed by: R・O・N featuring Takuto Maeda from count lost
"straying in the dark": Episode:22
Lyrics, composition and arrangement by: R・O・N
Performed by: R・O・N
"wish": Episode:23
Lyrics and composition by: meg rock
Arrangement by: Daisuke Katou
Performed by: meg rock
"pieces": Episode:24 insert ending theme.
Lyrics, composition and arrangement by: R・O・N
Performed by: R・O・N featuring Junko from electlink

CD Albums
Opening theme Single "clover" (LHCM-1015) performed by meg rock.
Ending theme Single  performed by Tomoe Ohmi.
Insert theme Single  performed by Tomoe Ohmi.
Vocal album Single "promise" (LHCA-5029) performed by R・O・N.
"SoltyRei Original Soundtrack Vol.1" (LHCA-5026) composed by Toshiyuki Ōmori.
"SoltyRei Original Soundtrack Vol.2" (LHCA-5032) composed by Toshiyuki Ōmori.
"Character & Radio Theme CD ~Solty × Rose~" (LHCM-1017) sung by Solty (CV: Momoko Saito) and Rose (CV: Masumi Asano).

Books

There is currently one volume of the manga released in Japan.


Release date: June, 2006

There is one visual fanbook already released in Japan.

SoltyRei Visual Fanbook
Release date: July 29, 2006

Staff
Director: Yoshimasa Hiraike
Script: Noboru Kimura
Art: Takimiya Kazutaka
Storyboard: Hirotaka Endo, Katsuyuki Kodera, Michio Fukuda, Ryuichi Kawamura
Episode Director: Masashi Abe, Ryuichi Kimura, Yoshihiko Iwada
Character Design: Shuzilow.HA(Shujirou Hamakawa)
Art Director: Toshihiro Kohama
Chief Animation Director: Shuzilow.HA(Shujirou Hamakawa)
Animation Director: Sawako Yamamoto, Shuichi Hara, Toshiharu Murata
Mechanical Design: Kanetake Ebikawa
Art Design: Hajime Satou
Director of Photography: Kosuke Tanaka
Executive Producer: Koji Kajita
Producer: Kazuhiko Inomata, Naomi Nishiguchi
3-D Director: Hirotsugu Shimoyama
Animation Producer: Hisao Fuke
Conceptual Design: Kenichi Sonoda, Range Murata
Editing: Kiyoshi Hirose
Music Producer: Junji Fujita, Yoshiyuki Ito
Music: Toshiyuki Ōmori
Planning: Shouji Murahama, Shuzilow.HA(Shujirou Hamakawa)
Planning Assistance: Goro Taniguchi
Sound Director: Yota Tsuruoka
Theme Song Lyrics: meg rock, Masami Okui, R・O・N, Mika Watanabe
Theme Song Composition: meg rock, Masami Okui, R・O・N, Toshiyuki Ōmori
Theme Song Arrangement: Daisuke Katou, Jun Ichikawa, R・O・N, Toshiyuki Ōmori
Theme Song Performance: meg rock, Tomoe Ōmi, R・O・N, Takuto Maeda, Junko, Geila Zilkha
Animation Production: Gonzo, AIC

Reception
Hyper comments that "Studio Gonzo are famous for using computer-generated elements along with their traditional cell animation, and this same technique is used fairly frequently on Solty Rei. The hand drawn animation is nicely done and the CGI is good too". Hyper criticises the CGI graphics showing "the strings" in many sequences that use CGI, "which can be an unwelcome distraction".

References

Sources
 Johnston, Chris. "Solty Rei volume 1". Newtype USA. 6 (1) p. 149. January 2007. .

External links
SOLTYREI Official Website 
SoltyRei from BIGLOBE 
SoltyRei Official Blog 
SoltyRei Official Website

Adventure anime and manga
Anime International Company
Anime with original screenplays
Funimation
Gonzo (company)
Ichijinsha manga
Odex
Post-apocalyptic anime and manga
Shōnen manga